Nkunda is a Congolese and Rwandan surname. Notable people with the name include:
 Elizabeth Nkunda Batenga, Tanzanian politician
 Laurent Nkunda (1967), Democratic Republic of the Congo politician
 Mutiganda Wa Nkunda (1989), Rwandan filmmaker
 Patience Nkunda Kinshaba, Ugandan politician
 Paulina Mateus Nkunda (1952–2013), Mozambican women's activist, veteran of the war of independence and politician

References 

Rwandan surnames
Tumbuka-Senga-language surnames